Porte Dauphine is the western terminus of Line 2 of the Paris Métro. It is situated in the 16th arrondissement. Avenue Foch station, served by the RER C line, is located nearby, as is Paris Dauphine University.

Location
The station is established under the Place du Maréchal-de-Lattre-de-Tassigny, on a loop comprising two half-stations approximately oriented north-west / south-east. It is preceded or followed (depending on the direction) by the Victor Hugo station.

History
Porte Dauphine station was inaugurated on 13 December 1900 as the western terminus of the first section of line 2 Nord which will more simply become line 2 on 17 October 1907. Although Line 2 had then been completed only as far as Charles de Gaulle–Étoile, it now runs from Porte Dauphine, around the northern part of Paris, through Montmartre, around to its eastern terminus at the Place de la Nation.

It is named after Porte Dauphine, a gate in the 19th-century Thiers wall of Paris. Its subtitle honours Jean de Lattre de Tassigny. because of its location under the square of the same name), French general officer, hero of the Second World War and Companion of the Liberation, who was raised to the dignity of Marshal of France posthumously. However, this subtitle does not appear on the plans.

As part of the RATP's Un métro + beau program, the station's corridors were renovated on 31 May 2011.

In 2019, 2,932,159 travelers entered this station which placed it at the 180th position of the metro stations for its attendance of 302.

Passenger services

Access
The station is famous for one of its entrances, created by Hector Guimard, registered as a historic monument by the decree of 12 February 2016 and completely restored in October 1999 for the celebrations of the centenary of the Paris metro. It has a total of four metro outlets:
 entrance 1 - Boulevard Lannes, consisting of a fixed staircase diverging into two other staircases, each decorated with a Dervaux candelabra, leading to Place du Paraguay at the right of nos. 81 and 83 of Avenue Foch;
 entrance 2 - Avenue Foch, consisting of a fixed staircase also decorated with a Dervaux mast, located north of the odd median of this avenue;
 entrance 3 - Boulevard de l'Amiral-Bruix, consisting of a fixed staircase topped with the only original Guimard kiosk with a canopy in the Art Nouveau style, located opposite the Place des Généraux-de-Trentinian on the even side of the Avenue Foch;
 entrance 4 - Avenue Bugeaud, consisting of a fixed staircase allowing only an exit and equipped with a more modest Guimard entourage (also classified as a historic monument), leading to the angle formed by this avenue and the odd alley of Avenue Foch, to the right of no. 77 of the latter.

Station layout

Note: The station is on a loop, so the westbound/drop-off and eastbound platforms are slightly offset.

Platforms
Porte Dauphine is a station with a particular configuration. It is made up of two divergent half-stations framing a very tight turning loop, only thirty meters in radius, according to its original racket layout, which is the only network to be fully preserved. The arrival half-station to the north has two central tracks, the northern one serving a single lateral platform, while the southern one, a dead-end to the west and without a platform, is used for the train depot and runs technical rooms. The half-station for departure is made up of two tracks separated by an island platform, that of the north a dead-end, in the west, also serving as depot. The vault is elliptical in both cases.

The station is also one of only two in the network, with Porte de Vincennes on line 1, to have preserved its original decoration in flat cream-colored tiles, which is one of the experimental decorations tested in 1900 before selecting the famous bevelled white tile for other parts of the network. This tiling covers the walls, the vault and the tympans. Lighting is provided by a tube strip in each half station. The platforms are free of advertisements and the name of the station is inscribed on enamel plaques, in capital letters or in Parisine font depending on the location. The boarding platform has benches made of wooden slats painted red.

Architecture
The station contains one of the three remaining "dragonfly" roofed Métro entrances by Hector Guimard (1867–1942), the Art Nouveau architect who was originally commissioned by the Compagnie du Métropolitain de Paris (CMP) in 1899 to design the entrances for the Métro stations. It is the only roofed entrance that is original, not reconstructed, and on its original site. It was restored in 1999.

Other connections
The station is connected by public road to the Avenue Foch station located on RER C. It is also served by the PC line of the RATP Bus Network.

Gallery

See also
 List of stations of the Paris Métro

References

Paris Métro stations in the 16th arrondissement of Paris
Railway stations in France opened in 1900
Art Nouveau architecture in Paris
Art Nouveau railway stations